Mapmaker(s), Map maker(s), or The Mapmaker may refer to:

 A cartographer, a person who studies and practices the art of making maps
 Mapmaker (album), the album by Parts & Labor
 Google Map Maker service
 "The Mapmakers", a 1955 short story by Frederik Pohl
 The Mapmaker, a 1957 novel by Frank G. Slaughter
 Mapmaker (2001 film), starring Brían F. O'Byrne
The Mapmaker (film), 2011 English drama film

See also
 Cartographer (disambiguation)